is a railway station in Yamaguchi, Yamaguchi Prefecture, Japan.

Lines
The station is served by the Yamaguchi Line.

Station layout
The station consists of two side platforms serving two tracks. An overpass connects the two platforms. The station building and sole entrance is located at the northeast end of the station. An automatic ticket machine is also located there. The station is unattended.

Platforms

Adjacent stations

History
The station opened on 20 February 1913.

External links
 Official website 

Railway stations in Yamaguchi Prefecture
Railway stations in Japan opened in 1913